Thomas Clarence Morrison  (28 July 1913 – 31 August 1985) was a New Zealand rugby union player and administrator. A wing three-quarter, Morrison represented South Canterbury and Wellington at a provincial level. He was a member of the New Zealand national side, the All Blacks, on their 1938 tour of Australia, playing in five matches including three internationals. He later served on the executive of the New Zealand Rugby Union from 1946 to 1968, and was its chairman between 1962 and 1968. He was also a national selector between 1950 and 1956.

During World War II Morrison served with the 27th (Machine Gun) Battalion, enlisting as a corporal in 1939. In February 1942 he was commissioned as a second lieutenant.

In the 1968 New Year Honours, Morrison was appointed a Commander of the Order of the British Empire, for services to sport, especially rugby football. He died on 31 August 1985 and his ashes were buried in Makara Cemetery, Wellington.

References

External links
 

1913 births
1985 deaths
Rugby union players from Gisborne, New Zealand
New Zealand rugby union players
New Zealand international rugby union players
South Canterbury rugby union players
Wellington rugby union players
Rugby union wings
New Zealand military personnel of World War II
New Zealand Rugby Football Union officials
New Zealand Commanders of the Order of the British Empire
Burials at Makara Cemetery